The Surtees Racing Organisation was a race team that spent nine seasons (1970 to 1978) as a constructor in Formula One, Formula 2, and Formula 5000.

History

The team was formed by John Surtees, a four-time 500cc motorcycle champion and the 1964 Formula One champion.  Surtees formed the team in 1966 for the newly formed CanAm series (an unlimited sports car series), winning the championship as an owner/driver in its first year.  He fielded an entry in another newly formed series in 1969, becoming part of Formula 5000 after taking over the failed Leda F5000 project, and his team constructed its own cars for the first time. His team was successful, winning five races, consecutively, during a twelve race season.

This inspired Surtees to expand to Formula One, and after having had a difficult season with BRM in 1969, he decided to become an owner/driver again. The team ran the full 1970 season, but John  Surtees was forced to run the first four races in an old McLaren due to a delay in the construction of his in-house F1 car.  The new BP-sponsored car earned its first (and only) points that year in the Canadian Grand Prix.

Three drivers, Surtees, Stommelen, and motorcycling champion Mike Hailwood earned three points each for the marque that year.

Hailwood returned to Surtees for a full year; joining him were Australian Tim Schenken and Italian Andrea de Adamich, the latter of whom brought sponsorship money to the team. Hailwood produced Surtees' first podium finish that year in the Italian Grand Prix, finishing second to Emerson Fittipaldi. All three drivers scored points for the team, and Surtees finished fifth in the Constructors' Championship.

Schenken was replaced in 1973 by Brazilian Carlos Pace, and the team only ran two full-time cars after de Adamich left following the season opener. Pace finished third in Austria and fourth in Germany, but it was the only points finishes the team had all season, as Hailwood was left scoreless. It was a difficult year for Surtees, as Pace left the team in mid-season, and replacement Derek Bell struggled to qualify for races, capped by Austrian driver Helmut Koinigg's fatal crash at the 1974 United States Grand Prix. A fourth place by Pace at his home track were the only points Surtees managed to get, and they failed to finish in the top ten in the Constructors' Championship.

The season was a tremendous struggle for Surtees, with no points scored, and the team missed three of the final four races. 1976 was much better, however, as Surtees landed a well-known, but otherwise controversial sponsorship deal with Durex condoms, and Australian Alan Jones joined the team. Jones finished fifth in Belgium and at Brands Hatch, and fourth in Japan. A second car, with Chesterfield sponsorship, was entered for American Brett Lunger, while a customer car was raced by Frenchman Henri Pescarolo during the second half of the season. With seven points, Surtees placed tenth in the Constructors' Championship.

Jones's success resulted in him leaving the team for the emerging Shadow team, and money problems forced Surtees to run one car regularly again in 1977, this time for Vittorio Brambilla. Brambilla's season was effective, also finishing in the points three times. Still, his good results did not prevent Surtees from further monetary troubles. In 1978, the team added a second car for pay driver, Briton Rupert Keegan, but the money problems continued. A lack of decent results caused further problems.

After racing the car in the British Aurora championship (formerly F5000) briefly that year, Surtees Racing Organization was closed for good.

Models

 TS5 1969-1970 F5000/Formula A. Based on the abandoned Leda prototype. Runner up in the 1969 Guards F5000 championship. Intended as a customer car, but there were no takers.
 TS7 1970 Formula One. Designed by Surtees, Shahab Ahmed, and Peter Connew. DFV/Hewland "kit car" followed closely on TS5 layout.  Surtees won the Oulton Park International Gold Cup non-Championship race in this car.
 TS8 1971-1972 F5000.  Runner up in Rothmans Championship in 1971.
 TS9 1971-1972 Formula One.  A derivative of the TS7 with a longer wheelbase and wider track. Surtees repeated his Oulton Park win in 1971.
 TS10 1972 Formula 2.  Powered by a Cosworth BDA engine Mike Hailwood convincingly won the 1972 European F2 Championship in this car. Two independent teams purchased TS10s but were not contenders in the series.
 TS11 1972-1973 F5000.  Based on the TS9 with a Chevrolet engine. Gijs van Lennep won the 1972 Rothmans European Formula 5000 Championship driving the TS11 and a McLaren M18. A TS11 chassis with TS8 bodywork was prepared to run the 1972 Tasman Series after the TS8 intended for the series was wrecked beyond repair.  Hailwood finished second in the series in this car.
 TS14 1972-1973 Formula One. This car marked the beginning of the end for Surtees. Firestone was anticipating leaving Formula One and had little interest in working with Surtees to cure the TS14's habit of devouring tires. It was the first car in F1 to fully comply with crumple-zone legislation, incorporating these into its side pods within which the radiators were mounted, laying down the floorplan for the vast majority of subsequent F1 designs. It was a very quick car at its introduction but a series of accidents and lack of development support did not help it reach its potential. John Surtees drove his last F1 race in the TS14 at Monza in 1972.
 TS15 1973 Formula two. With BMW supplying engines exclusively to March Surtees was forced to settle for second place in the F2 Championships. A good car, but no match for the BMW engine. A development of this car, the TS17, was intended to run a Ford Motor Company V8 in F5000, but nothing came of the plan.
 TS16 1974-1975 Formula One. Based on the TS14, but overweight and with less than top notch DFV engines. The team also failed to engage a single major sponsor for 1974 so money was tight to say the least.  Only a single car was run and to cap off a truly terrible year driver Helmuth Koinigg was killed during the 1974 United States Grand Prix at Watkins Glen. The car was run again in 1975 and John Watson scored in three non-Championship events, but no championship points were scored.
 TS19  1976-1978 Formula One.  A fresh car designed by John Surtees and Ken Sears the TS19 managed to score points for Surtees in 1976 and 1977, and even ran the opening races of the 1978 season.
 TS20 1978 Formula One.  A development of the TS19, the TS20 was a clean design that promised well, only to be completely overshadowed by the introduction of ground effects.

Complete Formula One World Championship results
The first table below details the complete World Championship Grand Prix results for the Surtees "works" team. The second table includes results from privately owned Surtees cars in World Championship Grands Prix.

Works team entries
(key)

Results of other Surtees cars
(key)

Can-Am results

See also

 Brabham Racing Organisation, Embassy Hill, Fittipaldi Automotive, Stewart Grand Prix, and Prost Grand Prix, five other Formula One teams established by champion drivers.

Notes

References
 Hodges, David. A-Z of Formula Racing Cars 1945-1990, MBI Publishing Company, 1990.

External links
 Surtees Racing Organization in The Formula 1 Database
 Barry Boors Racing Images
 Master of Endurance, The downfall of Fearless John's marque, by Mattijs Diepraam
 Constructors: Surtees Racing Organization

1964 establishments in the United Kingdom
British auto racing teams
British racecar constructors
Can-Am entrants
Formula One constructors
Formula Two constructors
Formula One entrants
Formula Two entrants
24 Hours of Le Mans teams
1979 disestablishments in the United Kingdom